Soddu may refer to:

People:
Celestino Soddu, an Italian architect.
Pietro Soddu, former President of Sardinia
Ubaldo Soddu, an Italian Army general during World War II.

Places:
Soddu (also Sodo), a town in Ethiopia.
Soddu Airport serving the Soddu area of Ethiopia.